The Grand Prix de Cannes was a single-day road cycling held annually in Cannes, Alpes-Maritimes, France from 1926 to 1991.

Winners

References

Cycle races in France
Recurring sporting events established in 1926
Recurring sporting events disestablished in 1991
1926 establishments in France
Defunct cycling races in France